Stefano Palatchi Ribera (born 26 March 1960), known publicly as Stefano Palatchi, is a Spanish opera singer who has sung leading bass roles in Spain and internationally and is noted for stage skills, timbre. and expressiveness. His concert repertoire includes Mozart's Requiem and Verdi's Messa da Requiem which he has sung many times.

Biography

Background

Palatchi was born in Barcelona.

His mother had studied under Conchita Badía, teacher of Montserrat Caballe.  Palatchi himself had started to study singing at age 15 under Maya Maiska.  He began singing zarzuela and then opera:  Un día, mientras estaba tomando clase con el maestro Puig, llegó Luis Andreu Marfà, entonces director artístico del Liceo, y me oyó cantar. Le gusté y me propuso interpretar un pequeño papel en Lohengrin de Wagner. Ese fue mi debut.One day, as I was taking class with my teacher Puig, in came Luis Andreu Marfà, then artistic director of the Liceu, and he heard me sing.  He liked me and proposed that I play a small role in Wagner's Lohengrin. That was my debut. He went on to study under Gino Bechi, Ettore Campogalliani, and Armen Boyajian, with further studies in Florence and New York.

Career

Palatchi debuted in the Gran Teatre del Liceu in Barcelona, in 1986.  He also performed in Turandot, when the Liceu was reopened in 1999, following the fire which had destroyed the theatre five years earlier.

He has taken part in several hundred performances of more than thirty operas from a wide repertoire, in particular operas by Giuseppe Verdi and Giacomo Puccini, and those from the bel canto repertoire including: Rigoletto, Aida, Turandot, Il trovatore,  La bohème, Macbeth, Lucia di Lammermoor, La forza del destino and Il barbiere di Siviglia, Samson et Dalila, and Thaïs.

He has sung in world premières of Cristóbal Colón, by Leonardo Balada (with Montserrat Caballé and José Carreras), Gaudí, by Joan Guinjoan and Joc de Mans by Alberto García Detesters.  In 2009, he partook in the Spanish premiere of Cristóbal Halffter's opera, Lazaro,  and Tales of Hoffmann

Palatchi has sung in theaters and festivals outside of Spain, including New York's Metropolitan Opera, where he made his debut in 1994 as Colline in La bohème.

Activities

Palatchi supports the Clarós Foundation dedicated to the prevention of and research into acute deafness.  As part of his support, he recites to raise funds for the charity.

Works

Television

Palatchi has appeared on television for opera performances,  including:
 Aida (2003)
 Margarita la tornera  (2000)
 Die Meistersinger von Nürnberg (1989)
 La Gioconda (1988)

Discography 

Palatchi has recorded for Decca, RTVE Música, Columna Música, Nightingale Classics, Koch Discover, Astrée Auvidis, Auvidis, Auvidis Valois, Sello Autor, Naxos and Opus Arte.

Repertoire 

He has expanded his repertoire into Jazz (2012), Russian Folk, and Swing (2014), the last of which has earned him the epithet "Crooner" in Spain.

Awards

In 2000, Palatchi received a Latin Grammy Award for Tomás Bretón's zarzuela, La Dolores.

He was nominated for another Latin Grammy for Ruperto Chapí's Margarita la Tornera (2003) and a Grammy Award for El gato con botas, by Xavier Montsalvatge.

See also
 Liceu
 Bass (vocal range)
 Latin Grammy Award for Best Classical Album
 4th Annual Latin Grammy Awards
 Margarita la tornera

References

External links 

 Official website
 
 ArtPro: Stefano Palatchi
 Taller de Musics: Stefano Palatchi
 Operabase:  Stefano Palatchi

Living people
Opera singers from Catalonia
21st-century Spanish male opera singers
Operatic basses
20th-century Spanish male opera singers
Singers from Barcelona
1960 births